Aleksey Vladimirovich Rybin (born 26 January 1988) is a Russian professional football player. He plays for Kuban Krasnodar.

Club career
He made his Russian Premier League debut for FC Tambov on 17 August 2019 in a game against FC Krasnodar, as a starter.

References

External links
 

1988 births
Sportspeople from Lipetsk
Living people
Russian footballers
Association football defenders
FC Metallurg Lipetsk players
FC Tambov players
FC Urozhay Krasnodar players
Russian Premier League players
Russian First League players
Russian Second League players